Belarus–Spain relations are the bilateral relations between Belarus and Spain.

Diplomatic relations 
On 13 February 1992 diplomatic relations were established.

Belarus has an embassy in Madrid. The ambassador of Spain in Moscow is accredited in Belarus. There is an honorary consul of Spain in Minsk. 

The bilateral relations maintained by Spain and Belarus are scarce. During the 2020–2021 Belarusian protests, Spain, along with the rest of the European Union countries, positioned itself in favor of the opposition leader Sviatlana Tsikhanouskaya and against the government of Aleksandr Lukashenko.

Economic relations 
In 2013, the bilateral trade with Belarus (189.7 million euros) represented 0.037% of the total trade of Spain with the rest of the world, which places that country as the 109th commercial partner of Spain.

The Spanish business presence is of little importance, although there have been significant growth rates of Spanish exports in recent years, which have gone from €79.56m in 2010 to €143.48m in 2013.

The main Spanish exports to Belarus are, in this order, machines and mechanical devices; fruits, vegetables and vegetables; automobile vehicles and stone manufactures. As for Belarusian imports, they are less diversified, since more than half are fuels and a quarter are fertilizers.

Cooperation 
Spain carries out a reception program for children from Belarus, affected by the Chernobyl disaster, by Spanish families (about 3,000
children at Christmas and summer). Spain contributed €50,000 [€2008] to the Trust Fund of the European Humanities University (in exile in Vilnius). From 2001 to 2012 there was a reader of AECID at the State Linguistic University of Minsk.

See also 
 Foreign relations of Belarus 
 Foreign relations of Spain 
 Belarus–EU relations

References

 
Spain
Belarus